Masaya is a masculine Japanese given name. Notable people with the name include:

, Japanese sport wrestler
, Japanese video game developer
, Japanese actor
, Japanese actor
, Japanese cross-country skier
, Japanese actor, voice actor and radio personality
, Japanese footballer
, Japanese musician and video game designer
Masaya Nakamura (disambiguation), several people
, Japanese baseball player
, Japanese footballer
, Japanese footballer
, Japanese footballer

Fictional Characters
, a character from Tokyo Mew Mew

Japanese masculine given names